Rogers Island is one of the Thimble Islands off Stony Creek, a section of Branford, Connecticut. Also known as Yon Comis Island, Rogers bears a 27-room Tudor mansion, with tennis and basketball courts and a caretaker's residence on a  estate valued at $15.41 million. It sold in 2003 for $22.3 million to Christine Stoecklein Svenningsen, widow of party goods magnate John Svenningsen. It sold again, most recently, in August 2018 for $21.5 million.

See also
Thimble Islands
Outer Lands

References
Wealthy Widow Buying Up Thimbles, "New Haven Register", January 22, 2006, page A1
Half a Mile Off the Coast; Stacey Stowe; "In the Region/Connecticut", New York Times, July 30, 2006; Real Estate page 10.

Specific

Thimble Islands
Long Island Sound